is a Japanese professional shogi player ranked 7-dan.

Early life
Shingo Sawada was born on November 21, 1991, in Suzuka, Mie. He finished in third place in the 26th (2001) and 27th (2002)  as the representative of Mie Prefecture.

Sawada entered the Japan Shogi Association's apprentice school at the rank of 6-kyū as a protegee of shogi professional  in March 2004 and was promoted to the rank of 1-dan in December 2007. Sawada was promoted to 3-dan in April 2008 and finished the 43rd 3-dan League (April 2008September 2008) with a record of 8 wins and 10 losses. He obtained full professional status and the rank of 4-dan in April 2009 after winning the 44th 3-dan League (October 2008March 2009) with a record of 14 wins and 4 losses.

Promotion history
The promotion history for Sawada is as follows:
 6-kyū: March 23, 2004
 4-dan: April 1, 2009
 5-dan: February 12, 2013
 6-dan: November 6, 2014
 7-dan: October 14, 2020

Awards and honors
Sawada received the Japan Shogi Association's Annual Shogi Award for "Most Consecutive Games Won" for the 20202021 shogi year.

References

External links
ShogiHub: Professional Player Info · Sawada, Shingo

1991 births
Japanese shogi players
Living people
Professional shogi players
Professional shogi players from Mie Prefecture